Mohammed Suerte Bennani (born Rabat, October 1961) is a Moroccan author of a science-fiction novel, L'Arc, published in May 2008.

Publications
 L'Arc

References

External links
http://www.telquel-online.com/380/mage_culture2_380.shtml
http://www.lematin.ma/Actualite/Journal/Article.asp?origine=jrn&idr=115&id=114944
http://www.lavieeco.com/guide-culturel/15116-rencontres.html
http://www.leconomiste.com/print_article.html?a=93239
http://essor-magazine.com/39/acteurs.pdf
http://www.libe.ma/Cafe-litteraire-L-Arc-de-Mohammed-Suerte-Bennani-debattu-a-Casablanca_a6940.html
http://fondationona.org/rencontres.htm

Moroccan writers in French
Moroccan science fiction writers
1961 births
Living people
Writers from Rabat
20th-century Moroccan writers
21st-century Moroccan writers